The Arkansas Research and Test Station or ARTS, is a historic satellite ground station in the hills of Montgomery County, Arkansas.  It was built in 1965 by the Space Systems Division of the Hughes Aircraft Company, and operated until 1969.  It includes a paraboloid antenna  in diameter and a utilitarian control building located nearby.  It is the only surviving ground station from that period capable of sending and receiving communications with a satellite; the only other one ever built, located in Andover, Maine, has had its antenna dismantled.

The property was listed on the National Register of Historic Places in 2017.

See also
National Register of Historic Places listings in Montgomery County, Arkansas

References

Infrastructure completed in 1965
National Register of Historic Places in Montgomery County, Arkansas
1965 establishments in Arkansas
Hughes Aircraft Company
Ground stations
Telecommunications infrastructure on the National Register of Historic Places
Antennas (radio)